is a passenger railway station in the city of Jōsō, Ibaraki Prefecture, Japan operated by the private railway company Kantō Railway.

Lines

Station layout
The station consists of a single side platform serving traffic in both directions. The station is unattended.

Adjacent stations

History
Kita-Mitsukaidō Station was opened on 15 March 1972.

Passenger statistics
In fiscal 2017, the station was used by an average of 447 passengers daily).

Surrounding area
The station is located in a suburban area of Jōsō city.

See also
 List of railway stations in Japan

References

External links

  Kantō Railway Station Information 

Railway stations in Ibaraki Prefecture
Railway stations in Japan opened in 1972
Jōsō, Ibaraki